The Silchester eagle is a Roman bronze casting dating from the first or second century CE, uncovered in 1866 at Calleva Atrebatum in Silchester, Hampshire, England. It was purchased in 1980 by Reading Museum in Berkshire where it remains on display .

History

The Silchester eagle was discovered, wingless and damaged, on 9 October 1866 by Rev J. G. Joyce during the excavation of a Roman basilica where it was likely part of a larger statue. It was found buried in a layer of charred wood, leading the discoverer to believe that it might have been the sacred eagle of a Roman legion and had been hidden for safekeeping in the rafters of the aerarium (treasury).

However, more recent archaeologists have suggested that the piece may have been intended as nothing more than scrap metal by the Romans at the time that it was lost, and was awaiting being recycled when the aerarium burnt down. The curve of the feet suggests that the eagle's talons had grasped a globe that was probably held in the hand of a statue, possibly of Jupiter.

See also
The Eagle of the Ninth, the 1954 novel by Rosemary Sutcliff that was inspired by the Silchester eagle
The Eagle, the 2011 film based on the novel

References

External links

Archaeological artifacts
Eagles
Roman Britain
Ancient Roman military standards
Birds in art